Harlan Bradley "Gotch" Carr (April 30, 1903 – October 24, 1970) was a professional football player from Union Springs, New York. He attended Syracuse University and made his professional debut in the National Football League in 1927 with the Pottsville Maroons. He also played for the Buffalo Bisons in 1927. He scored two rushing touchdowns in ten NFL games during his 1-year career.

Harlan played basketball with Vic Hanson at Syracuse University. After his collegiate career, he also played with Vic Hanson's All-Americas pro basketball team for two seasons from 1928 to 1930.

Notes

External links
 http://www.orangehoops.org/HCarr.htm
 https://www.baseball-reference.com/minors/player.cgi?id=carr--001har
 https://web.archive.org/web/20111122234602/http://databasefootball.com/players/playerpage.htm?ilkid=CARRHAR01
 Gersbacher, Ron. (2012, January 27). "History of Syracuse Baseball," ch. 15

1903 births
1970 deaths
Basketball players from New York (state)
Buffalo Bisons (NFL) players
Sportspeople from Auburn, New York
Pottsville Maroons players
Syracuse Orangemen baseball players
Syracuse Orange football coaches
Syracuse Orange football players
Syracuse Orange men's basketball players
Syracuse Stars (baseball)
American men's basketball players
Auburn High School (Auburn, New York) alumni